Another Country is a studio album by singer-songwriter Tift Merritt.  It was recorded in the summer of 2007, produced in L.A. by George Drakoulias, and released on February 26, 2008, by Fantasy Records. For her third album, Tift Merritt took hiatus with a piano in Paris and came home with her most personal and powerful songs to date.   Merritt has described the writing as a plainspoken look at the distance we all attempt to cross: between two people, between one heart and the rest of the world.

In its first week of release, the album's first single "Broken" reached #1 on the Americana Radio Chart compiled by the Americana Music Association. This is her second time working with producer George Drakoulias, who produced her last studio album Tambourine.

Track listing
All songs written by Tift Merritt, unless otherwise noted.

Personnel
 Tift Merritt – vocals, guitar, piano
 Zeke Hutchins – drums
 Charlie Sexton – guitar
 Doug Pettibone – guitar, Pedal steel guitar
 Josh Schwartz – rhythm guitars
 George Drakoulias – acoustic guitar, percussion
 David Ralicky – horns
 Patrick Warren – Chamberlain
Technical
 Rafael Serrano – recording engineer
 David Bianco – recording engineer, mixing
 Doug Sax, Sangwook "Sunny" Nam – mastering
 Mark Borthwick – photography
 Tommy Steele – art direction

References

2008 albums
Tift Merritt albums
Albums produced by George Drakoulias